Janáček (feminine: Janáčková) is a Czech surname, derived from the given name Jan, the Czech form of John. Notable people with the surname include:

 Jaromír Janáček, Czech badminton player
 Jitka Janáčková, Czech canoer
 Grażyna Prokopek-Janáček (born 1977), Polish sprinter
 Leoš Janáček (1854–1928), Czech composer
 Liana Janáčková, Czech politician
 Libor Janáček (born 1969), Czech footballer
 Štěpán Janáček (born 1977), Czech pole vaulter
 Světlana Janáčková, Czech volleyball player

Czech-language surnames
Patronymic surnames
Surnames from given names